

Offseason
Former Gopher women’s hockey greats Erica Killewald and Nadine Muzerall (Class of 2001) were inducted into the University of Minnesota’s "M"  Club Hall of Fame on Thursday Sept. 27, 2007. Killewald and Muzerall were two of 13 Gopher greats to be inducted at the annual Hall of Fame Banquet. The duo are the first women’s hockey players to be inducted into the hall of fame and the youngest in the group of 13.

Regular season
The Gopher power play (which included Gigi Marvin and Rachel Drazan), ranked first in the WCHA and third in the nation with a 24.5 conversion percentage. Gigi Marvin led the league in power-play points with 24. 
Kelli Blankenship was in her sophomore season. She produced four goals and seven assists for 11 points. In the opening weekend of the season (October 16), she had an assist in the 4-2 win over Boston University. On October 19, she scored a goal and an assist in the 7-4 win over Ohio State. She held a season-high three-game scoring streak with points against Bemidji State and Ohio State (on February 1, 2 and 8).
Rachel Drazan was paired with Anya Miller the entire 2007-08 season. She ranked fifth in scoring and second among defensemen when she scored 10 goals and 17 assists for 27 points.  She scored five game-winning goals, seven power-play goals and a short-handed goal in her junior campaign.  
On the power play, Drazan tied for third in the conference in power-play points with13. Her first points as a Gopher came in a game against Northeastern on October 5. She had a goal and an assist. On November 3, she scored a goal and an assist in the Gophers’ 3-2 victory over Wisconsin. From Nov. 18-Jan. 5, Drazan held a season-high eight-game scoring streak. During said streak, she notched nine points . She set a career-best three points in the 7-3 defeat of Ohio State on February 8. 
Melanie Gagnon was in her junior season. She appeared 35 games and scored three goals and 11 assists for 14 points, while earning her third letter. She started the season with an assist against Northeastern and against Boston University on October 5 and 6. In a 7-4 win over Ohio State on October 19, she tied a career-high three assists. She scored her first goal of the year on November 30 in a 5-0 win over Bemidji State. In a game played on February 1, which was a 5-1 defeat over North Dakota, she netted a power play goal. (2/1).
Goaltender Jenny Lura was in her freshman season and played in 16 games, while accumulating a 10-4-2 record with two shutouts. In the process, she earned her first letter and was named to the WCHA All-Rookie Team. Statistically, she held a 1.92 goals against average and a .910 save percentage. Lura earned her first career start in the come-from-behind win over Boston University on October 6. On October 26 and 27, she got back-to-back wins over then No. 1 Minnesota Duluth and only allowed two goals during the series. Lura earned her first career shutout on December 1 with a 1-0 decision against Bemidji State. The following week, she added her second-straight shutout in a 1-0 win against Minnesota State. On January 13, she helped the Gophers to a 2-1 win over tenth ranked Boston College.
Gigi Marvin was in her junior season with the Golden Gophers. She played in all 38 games for the Gophers and led the team with 54 points. She was second in WCHA league scoring with 38 points. Her 31 assists ranked first on the team, second in the WCHA and ninth in the nation (0.82 assists per game). She tied for third in the WCHA in goals scored with 23. During the season, she was a three-time WCHA Offensive Player of the Week. In addition, she started the season with a five-game scoring streak.
Marvin tallied two assists in wins over Northeastern (10/5) and against then-No. 1 ranked Minnesota Duluth (10/27). She also had four-point performances against Bemidji State (11/30) and Minnesota State (12/7). On February 8, Marvin scored two goals and two assists in three shots in the 7-3 win over Ohio State. The following day, she had a three-point performance against the Buckeyes for a season-high seven points in the series sweep. 
In the 5-0 win over Bemidji State on November 30, Marvin established her 100th-career point. At season’s end, she had 57 goals and 81 assists for 138 points in 114 games played.  From Jan. 18-Feb. 16, she held a 10-game scoring streak from and produced 19 point.
Dagney Willey was in her junior season and appeared in all 38 games and earned her third letter. Of her nine assists on the season, four came on the power play. She set up a power-play goal and an even strength goal in the 5-0 won over Bemidji State on November 30. She tallied two power-play assists in the 6-3 win against Wayne State on January 5.

Postseason
 WCHA First Round playoffs 
Gigi Marvin contributed five points in the sweep over North Dakota 
 WCHA Final Face-off 
Gigi Marvin scored two goals against Wisconsin 
Dagney Willey held an assist in the Gophers’ WCHA FINAL FACEOFF game against Wisconsin on March 8

International competition
Rachel Drazan and Gigi Marvin went on to compete with the United States at the 2008 IIHF World Championships. Both earned a gold medal when the team defeated Canada. 
Melanie Gagnon was a member of the Canadian Under-22 Team for the fifth-straight year.

Awards and honors
Kelli Blankenship, WCHA All-Academic 
Kelli Blankenship, Academic All-Big Ten 
Rachel Drazan, First Team All-WCHA 
Rachel Drazan, WCHA All-Academic honoree
Rachel Drazan, Academic All-Big Ten honoree 
Rachel Drazan, ranked second in the WCHA in points by a defensemen with 22 points 
Melanie Gagnon, Third-team All-WCHA honoree 
Melanie Gagnon,  Academic All-WCHA 
Melanie Gagnon, Academic Big Ten selection 
Jenny Lura, WCHA All-Rooke Team
Jenny Lura,  WCHA Rookie of the Week (Week of October 28)  
Gigi Marvin led WCHA in power-play points with 24. 
Gigi Marvin, Second-Team All-American 
Gigi Marvin, Patty Kazmaier Top 10 finalist 
Gigi Marvin,  First Team All-WCHA for the second straight year 
Gigi Marvin,  WCHA Scholar Athlete and WCHA All-Academic selection 
Gigi Marvin,  WCHA Final Face-Off All-Tournament Team 
Gigi Marvin, Named the team’s most valuable player for the second straight season with teammate Bobbi Ross 
Gigi Marvin,  Earned team’s Highest GPA award 
Dagney Willey, WCHA All-Academic honoree
Dagney Willey, Academic All-Big Ten honoree

References

External links
Official site

Minnesota Golden Gophers women's ice hockey seasons
Minnesota
Minn
Minne
Minne